Ottenheimer is a surname. Notable people with the surname include:

Albert M. Ottenheimer (1904–1980), American stage actor
Gerry Ottenheimer (1934–1998), Canadian politician
Helen Conway-Ottenheimer Canadian politician
John Ottenheimer (born 1953), Canadian lawyer and politician

See also
Ottenheimer Publishers